The burning of books and burying of scholars, also known as burning the books and executing the ru scholars, refers to the purported burning of texts in 213 BCE and live burial of 460 Confucian scholars in 212 BCE by the Chinese emperor Qin Shi Huang of the Qin dynasty. This was alleged to have destroyed philosophical treatises of the Hundred Schools of Thought, with the goal of strengthening the official Qin governing philosophy of Legalism.

Modern historians doubt the details of the story, which first appeared more than a century later in the Han Dynasty official Sima Qian's Records of the Grand Historian. As a court scholar, Sima had every reason to denigrate the earlier emperor to flatter his own, and later Confucians did not question the story. As one recent historian put it, their message was, "If you take our life, Heaven will take the life of your dynasty." 

Modern scholars agree that Qin Shi Huang gathered and destroyed many works that he regarded as incorrect or subversive. He ordered two copies of each school to be preserved in imperial libraries. Some were destroyed in the fighting following the fall of the dynasty. He had scholars killed, but not by being buried alive, and the victims were not "Confucians", since that school had not yet been formed as such.

Traditional version

Punishment of the scholars

According to the Sima Qian's Records of the Grand Historian (Shiji), after Qin Shi Huang, the first emperor of China, unified China in 221 BCE, his chancellor Li Si suggested suppressing intellectual discourse to unify thought and political opinion. 

Three categories of books were viewed by Li Si to be most dangerous politically. These were poetry (particularly the Shi Jing), history (Shujing and especially historical records of other states than Qin), and philosophy. The ancient collection of poetry and historical records contained many stories concerning the ancient virtuous rulers. Li Si believed that if the people were to read these works they were likely to invoke the past and become dissatisfied with the present. The reason for opposing various schools of philosophy was that they advocated political ideas often incompatible with the totalitarian regime.

Consequences
The extent of the damage to Chinese intellectual heritage is difficult to assess, for details have not been recorded in history. Several facts, however, indicate that the consequences of this event, although enduring, were not extensive. First, it is recorded in Li Si's memorial that all technological books were to be spared. Secondly, even the "objectionable" books, poetry and philosophy in particular, were preserved in imperial archives and allowed to be kept by the official scholars.

In some categories of books, history suffered one of the greatest losses of ancient times. Extremely few state history books before Qin have survived. Li Si stated that all history books not in the Qin interpretation were to be burned. It is not clear whether copies of these books were actually burned or allowed to stay in the imperial archives. Even if some histories were preserved, they possibly would have been destroyed in 206 B.C. when enemies captured and burnt the Qin imperial palaces in which the archives were most likely located.

Later book burnings
At the end of the Qin, the Epang Palace's national records were destroyed by fire. Tang dynasty poet Zhang Jie wrote a poem (titled 焚书坑, Fen Shu Keng, "Pits for Book-burning") about the policy of destruction by both the Qin dynasty and the rebels (of which Liu Bang and Xiang Yu were the examples cited as they entered the capital city Xianyang one after the other.):

Burial of the scholars

Tradition had it that after being deceived by two alchemists while seeking prolonged life, Qin Shi Huang ordered more than 460 scholars in the capital to be buried alive in the second year of the proscription. The belief was based on this passage in the Shiji  (chapter 6):

An account given by Wei Hong in the 2nd century added another 700 to the figure.

Skepticism
In 2010, Li Kaiyuan (李开元), a researcher in the field of history of Qin Dynasty and Han Dynasty, published an article titled The Truth or Fiction of the Burning the Books and Executing the Ru Scholars: A Half-Faked History (焚书坑儒的真伪虚实—半桩伪造的历史), which raised four doubts about "executing the ru scholars" ("坑儒") and argued that Sima Qian had misused historical materials. Li believes that the burning the books and executing the ru scholars is a pseudo-history that is cleverly synthesized with real "burning the books" (真实的"焚书") and false "executing the ru scholars" (虚假的"坑儒").

The scholar Michael Nylan observes that despite its mythic significance, the Burning of the Books legend does not bear close scrutiny. Nylan suggests that the reason Han dynasty scholars charged the Qin with destroying the Confucian Five Classics was partly to "slander" the state they defeated and partly because Han scholars misunderstood the nature of the texts, for it was only after the founding of the Han that Sima Qian labeled the Five Classics as "Confucian".

Nylan points out that the Qin court appointed classical scholars who were specialists on the Classic of Poetry and the Book of Documents, which meant that these texts  would have been exempted, and that the Book of Rites and the Zuozhuan did not contain the glorification of defeated feudal states which the First Emperor gave as his reason for destroying them. She suggests that the story might be based on the fact that the Qin palace was razed in 207 BCE and many books were undoubtedly lost at that time. Martin Kern adds that Qin and early Han writings frequently cite the Classics, especially the Documents and the Classic of Poetry, which would not have been possible if they had been burned, as reported.

Sima Qian's account of the execution of the scholars has similar difficulties. First, no text earlier than the Shiji mentions the executions, the Shiji mentions no Confucian scholar by name as a victim of the executions, and in fact, no other text mentions the executions at all until the 1st century AD. The earliest known use of the famous phrase "burning the books and executing the Confucians" is not noted until the early 4th century.

Sima Qian reports that the scholars were  "keng, 坑",  a word that he uses in several other places. The context in these places shows that the meaning is "to kill", not "to bury alive". The character in earlier texts meant "pit, moat" and then took on the meaning of "to trap and kill". Sima Qian used it to describe the annihilation of an enemy army. The misunderstanding came in later dynasties when the meaning of "to bury alive" became common.

See also

 History of China (Chinese classic texts)
 Mahayana sutras, in Mahayana Buddhism
 Chinese Buddhist canon, in Chinese Mahayana Chan Buddhism
 Twenty-Four Histories
 Confucianism
 Book burning (Book censorship) 
 Censorship (Freedom of thought)
 Four Olds
 Great Anti-Buddhist Persecution
 Literary Inquisition
 Cultural Revolution

Notes

Citations

References and further reading
 
 
 
 

  Online
 
 Sima Qian: "The First Emperor of Qín" Chapter 25 Burning Books & Burying Scholars David K. Jordan University of California San Diego.

External links

210s BC
3rd century BC in China
Anti-Confucianism
Anti-intellectualism
Book burnings
Book censorship in China
Chinese philosophy
Chinese words and phrases
Genocides in Asia
Massacres in China
Persecution of intellectuals
Political and cultural purges
Political repression in China
Qin dynasty
Qin Shi Huang

it:Qin Shi Huang#Riforme